Tsai Hsien-tang (born 29 April 1977), formerly known as Tsai Hui-kai, is a Taiwanese football (soccer) player. He played as a defender and a defensive midfielder.

Career 
During his participation in Tatung F.C., he was voted the best defensive midfielder after the Chinese Taipei National Football League 2005 season.

In October 2005, he suffered a serious knee ligament injury in training and was unable to represent Chinese Taipei at the 2005 East Asian Games held in Macau. The injury also made him unable to be in the starting lineup during the entire Enterprise Football League 2006 season.

In 2008, after he changed his name to Tsai Hsien-tang, he became captain of the Chinese Taipei national football team during the 2008 AFC Challenge Cup.

For the years of 2008-2012 he played for the national team of Taiwan. 

In 2017 he played for Tainan City. He retired in 2018.

References

1977 births
Living people
Taiwanese footballers
Tatung F.C. players
Chinese Taipei international footballers
Association football defenders
Footballers from Tainan